H6, H06, or H-6 may refer to:

Science
 British NVC community H6, an ecological designation
 Sanguiin H-6, a dimeric ellagitannin found in Sanguisorba officinalis, the great burnet
 Hydrogen-6 (H-6 or 6H), an isotope of hydrogen

Transportation

Aircraft
 Hughes OH-6 Cayuse, a 1963 American scout helicopter
 MD Helicopters MH-6 Little Bird, a special forces variant
 Xian H-6, a Chinese bomber
 Besson H-6, a French flying boat
 Sikorsky R-6, a 1943 American helicopter

Watercraft
 HMS H6, a British submarine
 USS H-6 (SS-149), a United States submarine
 HMS Hurricane (H06), a British Havant-class destroyer
 HMS Keith (H06), a British B-class destroyer

Other vehicles
 PRR H6, a steam locomotive
 Hispano-Suiza H6, an automobile

Roads
 H6 Childs Way, a road in England
 Highway H06, a road in the Ukraine

Other uses
 <h6></h6>, level 6 heading markup for HTML Web pages, see HTML element#heading
 Flat-six engine, sometimes marketed as H6
 Halloween: The Curse of Michael Myers, the sixth film in the Halloween franchise
 H6: Diary of a Serial Killer, a movie
 Composition H6, an explosive
 H6, a watch possibly made by John Harrison

See also
 6H (disambiguation)